Hit Man is an American television game show. The show aired on NBC from January 3 to April 1, 1983, and was hosted by Peter Tomarken. Rod Roddy was the announcer, and the program was produced by Jay Wolpert Productions in association with Metromedia Video Productions.

Game play
Four contestants competed on each episode of Hit Man in a quiz based on memory and instant recall. One was either a returning champion or champion-designate, with the other three contestants competing for the right to face him/her in the second round. The surviving contestant at the end of two rounds of play played the Triple Crown bonus round for $10,000.

Round 1
Each game of Hit Man began with the three challengers, who were sitting behind desks colored blue, yellow, and green, playing to determine who would advance to face the champion. Each contestant’s desk had a cartoon character placed on it, which was referred to as the titular “hit man”.

The round began with the challengers viewing a short film narrated by Tomarken. Film topics varied widely and included biographies, the "making-of" specific films, professions, hobbies, etc. The film was also shown to the returning champion offstage, since the subject matter would also be used for the Triple Crown. After the film concluded, a series of tossup questions were asked to the challengers about the film they had just seen.

Positioned behind the players’ desks was a game board. The board was designed to resemble a ladder, and each correct answer moved a challenger’s hit man up a step toward the top of the board. At the top of the board was a checkered line, and to win the round the challengers had to answer enough questions to reach it. This took five correct answers to accomplish, and the first contestant to do this won $300 and clinched a spot in the second round. The remaining two contestants continued playing until one of them gave a fifth correct answer, and that contestant won $200 and ended the round. The remaining contestant was eliminated from further play and received parting gifts.

Round 2
For the second round, the champion entered the game and sat behind a red desk that was elevated. As before, another film was shown and a series of tossup questions pertaining to the film were asked. The objective for the second round was for the contestants to defend a series of hit men. The challengers were given four and three hit men, based on how they finished the first round,  while the champion was given seven. Initial control of the round was determined by the winner of the first round.

Each tossup was played in the following manner. Both the challenger in control and the champion were asked the question, and the first to buzz in got the opportunity to answer. A correct answer resulted in a hit man being eliminated from the other side, but cost the contestant one of their own if incorrect or time expired. A challenger maintained control as long as he/she kept answering correctly, with incorrect answers resulting in the other challenger getting his/her turn.

Any player who lost all of their hit men was eliminated from the round. The challenger who eliminated the last of the champion's hit men became the new champion. If the champion eliminated all of the challenger's hit men, he/she remained the champion.

Triple Crown

The gameboard displayed eight columns with varying numbers of circles. One column held one circle; two columns held two circles; two columns held three circles; two columns held four circles; and one held five circles. The contestant turned his/her back to the board, and the columns were randomly re-ordered.

The contestant had 60 seconds to answer questions based on either of the day's two stories. The clock started as soon as he/she chose a column, and each correct answer placed a money man in one of its circles. The contestant chose a different column after a pass or incorrect answer, or after filling every circle in the column.

Each column successfully filled won the contestant $1,000. If the contestant successfully filled any three columns with money men before time expired, he/she won $10,000.

Champions continued competing for a maximum of five matches unless defeated.

Broadcast history
Hit Man premiered on January 3, 1983, as one of three new game shows on NBC's daytime schedule, along with the new Just Men! and a revival of Sale of the Century, that the network commissioned to replace the cancelled serials Texas and The Doctors. Hit Man and its lead-in program, Wheel of Fortune, were moved to the slot Texas had occupied, with Hit Man airing at 11:30 AM Eastern.

Although NBC was drawing better ratings in the hour, Hit Man suffered from ratings trouble against the second half of The Price is Right on CBS and reruns of The Love Boat on ABC and the network did not renew the series beyond its original sixty-five episode commitment, with the final episode airing on April 1. On the final episode, instead of doing the usual request for contestants during the final segment, announcer Rod Roddy told the home audience, "If you would like to be a contestant on Hit Man, forget it!" The show was replaced by Dream House hosted by Bob Eubanks. Hit Man and Just Men! both ended their runs on the same day, but Sale continued for another six years, ending in 1989.

Peter Tomarken later hosted Press Your Luck, which debuted in September 1983 (five months after Hit Man ended) and ran for three years on CBS. Rod Roddy reunited with Tomarken as the announcer of Press Your Luck, and later became Johnny Olson's permanent replacement in 1986 as announcer on The Price Is Right. Roddy held this position until his death in 2003.

International versions

References

External links
 

1983 American television series debuts
1983 American television series endings
NBC original programming
1980s American game shows
Television series by Jay Wolpert Enterprises
Television series by Metromedia
English-language television shows